was a village located in Nyū District, Fukui Prefecture, Japan.

As of 2003, the village had an estimated population of 1,793 and a density of 116.81 persons per km². The total area was 15.35 km².

On February 1, 2006, Koshino, along with the town of Shimizu (also from Nyū District), and the town of Miyama (from Asuwa District), was merged into the expanded city of Fukui.

Dissolved municipalities of Fukui Prefecture
Fukui (city)